Gammon may refer to:

People 
 Archer T. Gammon (1918–1945), United States Army soldier and Medal of Honor recipient
 James Gammon (1940–2010), American actor
 James Gammon (engraver), English engraver
 Kendall Gammon (born 1968), American football player
 Reg Gammon (1894–1997), English painter
 Richard Gammon (born 1898), English World War I flying ace
 Richard Von Albade Gammon (1879–1897), American football player
 Roland Gammon (1915–1981), American writer
 Russell Gammon (1906–1968), Canadian rower
 Steve Gammon (born 1939), Welsh footballer
 Wayne Gammon (born 1950), Australian rower

Other uses 
 De Gammon, the language of Irish Travellers
 Gammon, a victory in backgammon achieved before the loser removes a single checker
 Gammon, a word in Australian Aboriginal English with various meanings, mainly relating to lying or pretence
 Gammon (insult), a British pejorative insult term
 Gammon (meat), a cut of quick-cured pork leg
 Gammon, the rope lashing or iron hardware to attach a mast to a boat or ship
 Gammon bomb, a British hand grenade used during World War II
 Gammon Construction, a Hong Kong construction company
 Gammon India, an Indian civil engineering construction company
 Gammon Lake, in Ontario, Canada
 SA-5 Gammon, the NATO designation for the Russian Angara/Vega/Dubna surface-to-air missile system

See also 
 Gammons, a surname